Fuertes is a surname. Notable people with the surname include:

Antonio Fuertes (1929–2015), Spanish footballer
Gloria Fuertes (1917–1998), Spanish poet and author of children's literature
Gustavo Fuertes (born 1959), Spanish screenwriter and director of Spanish cinema
Eduardo Fuertes (born 1943), Filipino footballer
Esteban Fuertes (born 1972), Argentine football striker 
Estevan Antonio Fuertes (1838–1903), Puerto Rican-American astronomer and civil engineer
James Hillhouse Fuertes (1863–1932), United States civil and sanitary engineer
José María Mohedano Fuertes (born 1948), Spanish lawyer and politician
Juan Jose Fuertes Martinez (born 1976), Spanish swimmer
Louis Agassiz Fuertes (1874–1927), American ornithologist, illustrator and artist
Jesus Fuertes (1938–2006), Spanish Cubist painter
Maria Fuertes, 2020 American murder victim
Pilar Fuertes Ferragut (1962–2012), Spanish diplomat
Xavier Pascual Fuertes (born 1968), Spanish former handball player and current coach

See also    
Fuertes Observatory,  is an astronomical observatory located on the North Campus of Cornell University in Ithaca, New York

References